Laccornis is a genus of beetles in the family Dytiscidae, containing the following species:

 Laccornis conoideus (LeConte, 1850)
 Laccornis deltoides (Fall, 1923)
 Laccornis difformis (LeConte, 1855)
 Laccornis etnieri Wolfe & Spangler, 1985
 Laccornis kocae (Ganglbauer, 1904)
 Laccornis latens (Fall, 1937)
 Laccornis nemorosus Wolfe & Roughley, 1990
 Laccornis oblongus (Stephens, 1835)
 Laccornis pacificus Leech, 1940
 Laccornis schusteri Wolfe & Spangler, 1985

References

Dytiscidae